The Royal Securities Exchange of Bhutan is the only stock exchange in Bhutan. It is one of the world's smallest stock exchanges, with a market capitalization of around 375 million dollars and 21 listed companies as of February 2015. , market capitalization increased to BTN 28,044,944,642. Currently, the market capitalization is BTN 46,352,368,375 (about 600 million dollars) with 20 listed companies (July 2020)

It is located in the Royal Insurance Corporation of Bhutan (RICBL) building in Thimphu. The capital for the establishment of the stock exchange was provided by Bank of Bhutan, the Royal Insurance Corporation of Bhutan, Unit Trust of Bhutan (now Bhutan National Bank) and the Bhutan Development Finance Corporation. The Royal Securities Exchange of Bhutan is a member of the South Asian Federation of Exchanges.

References

External links
 Bhutan - Banking and securities
 20,000 plus to get refunds

Stock exchanges in Asia
Economy of Bhutan
Financial services companies established in 1993
1993 establishments in Bhutan